Cryphaea lamyana is an aquatic moss found in unpolluted rivers, It is local or rare throughout its range and in the UK is restricted to a few sites in Cornwall and Devon and a number of sites on the River Teifi where it is most commonly found.

Its common name is multi-fruited river moss so named because of the spherical orange capsules in which it bears its spores.

References

Hypnales